John Scott Anderson (born 31 March 1954) is an Australian Olympic sailor who competed in the 1984 Summer Olympics.

References

External links
 
 
 

1954 births
Living people
Australian male sailors (sport)
Olympic sailors of Australia
A-Class world champions
Tornado class sailors
Tornado class world champions
World champions in sailing for Australia
Sailors at the 1984 Summer Olympics – Tornado
20th-century Australian people